The 2020-21 Gran Turismo D1 Grand Prix series is the twentieth season of D1 Grand Prix series which started at Okuibuki Motorpark on 24 July 2020 and ended at Tsukuba Circuit on 31 January 2021. The season was supposed to start on 16 May, but was delayed due to the COVID-19 pandemic.

Masashi Yokoi entered the season as the defending champion.

Teams and drivers 
Due to COVID-19 travel restrictions, only Japanese drivers participated in the season, with no foreigners competing.

Schedule

2020 schedule

Proposed schedule before pandemic

Series ranking

Drivers' ranking 

Note :

 Bold : Tsuiso (Dual-run) Winner
 Italic : Tanso (Single-run) WInner

Tanso series ranking 

Note : 

Bold : Tanso (Single-run) Winner

Teams' ranking 

Source : 2020 D1GP series ranking

References

External links 
 Official Website (In Japanese)

D1 Grand Prix seasons
D1 Grand Prix